Gavignano is a town   in the Metropolitan City of Rome, Lazio, central Italy. Gavignano is approximately 50 km south east of Rome, on a hill in the Lepini Mountains.

The name of the town is believed to be derived from the Roman consul and general Aulus Gabinius, a friend of Pompey and ally of   Julius Caesar.

The nearest train station is located in the town of Colleferro. Nearby, within the communal territory, is an archaeological site of a Roman villa from the Republican era, the villa "Rossilli",  believed to be a country home of the Julii family. At Rossilli there is also a historical abbey, built by the Benedictines in the 12th century.

Pope Innocent III was born there in 1160.

References

Cities and towns in Lazio